Vladica Petrović (born 23 December 1970) is a Serbian football manager and former player.

Playing career
After playing for Loznica in the First League of FR Yugoslavia, Petrović moved abroad in 1995. He went on to have short spells at three clubs in the lower leagues of Portugal football, before returning to his homeland and rejoining Budućnost Valjevo. Later on, Petrović also played professionally in Greece.

Managerial career
After hanging up his boots, Petrović served as manager of Metalac Gornji Milanovac on three occasions, lastly in the 2014–15 season. He also worked at Drina Zvornik of the Premier League of Bosnia and Herzegovina.

In December 2019, Petrović took charge of Greek club Aiolikos. He left in October 2020.

References

External links
 
 
 
 

1970 births
Living people
Yugoslav footballers
Serbia and Montenegro footballers
Serbian footballers
Association football midfielders
FK Budućnost Valjevo players
FK Obilić players
FK Loznica players
C.D. Nacional players
SC Vianense players
F.C. Tirsense players
Ethnikos Piraeus F.C. players
Second League of Serbia and Montenegro players
First League of Serbia and Montenegro players
Liga Portugal 2 players
Serbia and Montenegro expatriate footballers
Expatriate footballers in Portugal
Expatriate footballers in Greece
Serbia and Montenegro expatriate sportspeople in Greece
Serbian football managers
FK Metalac Gornji Milanovac managers
FK Mladost Lučani managers
FK Drina Zvornik managers
FK Novi Pazar managers
Aiolikos F.C. managers
Serbian SuperLiga managers
Premier League of Bosnia and Herzegovina managers
Serbian expatriate football managers
Expatriate football managers in Bosnia and Herzegovina
Expatriate football managers in Greece
Serbian expatriate sportspeople in Bosnia and Herzegovina
Serbian expatriate sportspeople in Greece
Serbian expatriate sportspeople in Portugal